KBibTeX is a reference management software primarily for BibTeX which is typically used in conjunction with TeX/LaTeX. Beyond normal editing capabilities, KBibTeX offers features such as searching and importing new references from Google Scholar or BibSonomy.

KBibTeX uses KDE but is not part of the official KDE Software Compilation or Calligra. There exist two versions of KBibTeX: One that is built on KDE Platform 4, and another built on KDE Frameworks 5. KBibTeX was started in 2004 for KDE3. The online version of documentation to KBibTeX is hosted on KDE documentation server along with a copy in PDF form for the purpose of offline reading.

See also 
 Comparison of reference management software

References

External links 
 Thomas Fischer on KBibTeX, the KDE Reference Manager

Free BibTeX software
KDE Applications